Cala Pass is a high-altitude mountain pass situated in the Eastern Cape, province of South Africa, on the R410 Regional road, between Elliot and Cala.

References

Mountain passes of the Eastern Cape